Charles S. Roberts  (born October 25, 1950 in Santa Fe, New Mexico) is an American broadcast journalist, most notable for being the former weekday news anchor on Headline News, based in CNN's world headquarters in Atlanta, Georgia. He was the longest-serving anchor among the CNN networks and anchored weekday Headline News broadcasts from the network's debut on January 1, 1982—when he was the first anchor on-air— until his retirement on July 30, 2010.

Since he joined Headline News, Roberts led the network's coverage for each national election. In 2003, the U.S. Army Force Command in Atlanta asked Roberts to host the 228th birthday celebration of the U.S. Army.

In 1989, Roberts reported from a rooftop in Charleston, South Carolina, on Hurricane Hugo's arrival. In 1985, he reported live on the trial of Wayne Williams, who was convicted in the Atlanta child murders case. That same year he reported from the scene of a federal prison riot in Atlanta.

Before joining Headline News, Roberts was the principal weeknight anchor at KMTV in Omaha, Nebraska. During that time, he conducted an exclusive interview with serial killer Caril Ann Fugate for KMTV and flew aboard the Strategic Air Command post-nuclear-attack airborne command post "Looking Glass".

From 1973–1975, Roberts anchored the evening news at KRGV-TV in the Rio Grande Valley of Texas. Before joining KRGV, he was a newscaster at WHB Radio in Kansas City, Missouri, from 1971–1973. From 1970–1971, he anchored morning newscasts at KOMU-TV, the NBC affiliate in Columbia, Missouri. 
 
Roberts is a member of the Atlanta Press Club and the National Society of Professional Journalists. He is a recipient of the 1971 University of Missouri Faculty/Student Award for Outstanding Journalism and, in 1998, was inducted into the New Mexico Military Institute's Hall of Fame for "lifetime achievement in service to the ideals of America."

Roberts is a graduate of the New Mexico Military Institute (NMMI), a State of New Mexico supported educational institution located in Roswell, New Mexico. He earned a bachelor's degree in journalism from the University of Missouri. He volunteers with Project for Humanity causes in Atlanta.

Roberts became known nationally in Summer 2006 for referring in a question to Connecticut Senate Candidate  Ned Lamont as the "al-Qaeda" candidate.  His exact words were: "Might some argue -- as some have -- that Lamont is the al-Qaeda candidate?" A Google search on August 12, 2006, showed that there was no reference documented on the internet in which someone referred to Lamont as the "al-Qaeda candidate". In the blogosphere, Roberts' comment led to calls for an apology.  On August 13, 2006, Arianna Huffington, in an interview with CNN, demanded that Roberts be held accountable for his comment and wondered why he wasn't "demoted to covering Paris Hilton or entertainment news where the truth doesn't matter.". Roberts apologized on air to Lamont during the afternoon of August 15, 2006, saying, "...I posed [the question] badly, stupidly..."

Today, Roberts is working at WYAY Newsradio 106.7 in Atlanta, and serves as a consultant to them and its owner, Cumulus Media. He also provides reports for the station.

References

External links
 Chuck Roberts – Photos of Chuck Roberts on CNN Headline News over the years

Living people
American television news anchors
Missouri School of Journalism alumni
People from Columbia, Missouri
CNN people
1950 births
American male journalists